Nenad Đurđević (also transliterated Djurdjević; born 14 July 1987) is a Serbian footballer who plays as a forward for Sušica. Through the career, he changed many clubs in Serbia.

References

External links
 
 
 
 Nenad Đurđević at Utakmica.rs 

1987 births
Living people
Sportspeople from Kragujevac
Association football forwards
Serbian footballers
FK Šumadija 1903 players
FK Radnički 1923 players
FK BSK Borča players
FK Radnik Surdulica players
FK Kolubara players
FK Dinamo Vranje players
FK Loznica players
OFK Žarkovo players
FK Smederevo players
Serbian First League players
Serbian SuperLiga players